Magri Pora is a village in Anantnag tehsil of Anantnag district in the Kashmir Valley of Jammu and Kashmir, India. Magri Pora is situated 8 km away from the city of Anantnag.

Demographics
According to the 2011 Census of India, Hardu Toru village has a total population of 1,725 people including 882 males and 843 females; and has a literacy rate of 53.97%.

References 

Villages in Anantnag district